The Women's junior road race at the 2013 European Road Championships took place on 21 July. The Championships were hosted by the Czech Republic city of Olomouc. The course was 77 km long. 82 junior cyclists competed in this discipline.

Top 25 final classification

See also

 2013 European Road Championships – Women's junior time trial

References

2013 European Road Championships
2013 in women's road cycling